Succinea approximans is a species of air-breathing land snail, a terrestrial pulmonate gastropod mollusc in the family Succineidae, the amber snails.

Distribution
The type locality is in Puerto Rico. Robert James Shuttleworth, the authority of this species mentioned six localities in his original description: "prope San Juan, Fajardo, Ceiba, Humacao, Luquillo et ad Rio Blanco".

Other reports of Succinea approximans include:
 Grenada - occurs widely
 "Lesser Antilles", but not in Dominica
 Saint Lucia

Robinson et al. (2009) commented that it has not been reported from any intermediate islands. They considered reports of this species by Thomas B. Bland (1869) and George French Angas (1884) to be dubious.

Description
The dimensions of the shell of the type specimen are as follows: the height of the shell is 12 mm; the width of the shell is 7 mm; the height of the aperture is 9 mm.

In Grenada, the height of the shell of this species is 10 mm.

Ecology
The habitat of Succinea approximans ranges from relatively dry places to wet areas. In Grenada, Succinea approximans lives among leaf litter.

References

External links
 http://www.animalbase.uni-goettingen.de/zooweb/servlet/AnimalBase/home/speciestaxon?id=1163
 distribution map

Succineidae
Gastropods described in 1854